The Waldo Historic District  is a U.S. historic district in Waldo, Florida. On February 2, 2001, it was added to the U.S. National Register of Historic Places.

References

External links
 Florida's Office of Cultural and Historical Programs
 Alachua County listings
 Historic Markers in Alachua County

National Register of Historic Places in Alachua County, Florida
Historic districts on the National Register of Historic Places in Florida